This is a list of cricketers who played first-class cricket in England in matches between the 1851 and 1860 seasons. The sport of cricket had acquired most of its modern features by this time and roundarm bowling was firmly established, although overarm bowling was not accepted until 1863.

The players included are those known to have played in matches which were given retrospective first-class status between 1851 and 1860 inclusive.

A

B

C

D

E

F

G

H

I 
 Roger Iddison
 William Inge
 Charles Ingram
 John Isted

J 
 John Jackson
 C. Jeffcock
 William Jervis
 James Jiggins
 William Jiggins
 George Randall Johnson
 Jonathan Joy

K

L

M

N

O 
 Charles Oakeley
 Frederick Oliver
 Denzil Onslow
 Henry Osborn
 Charles Oxenden

P

R

S

T

V 
 Henry Veitch
 Henry Vernon
 Edmund Vyse

W

Y 
 G. Yates
 George Edward Yonge

See also
 List of English cricketers (1772–1786)
 List of English cricketers (1787–1825)
 List of English cricketers (1826–1840)
 List of English cricketers (1841–1850)
 List of English cricketers (1861–1870)

Notes

References

Bibliography
 
 
 

English cricketers 1851